Arnoldists were a Proto-Protestant Christian movement in the 12th century, named after Arnold of Brescia, an advocate of ecclesiastical reform who criticized the great wealth and possessions of the Roman Catholic Church, while preaching against infant baptism and Transubstantiation. His disciples were also called "Publicans" or "Poplecans", a name probably deriving from Paulicians (The term "Publicani" would be generally used for any heretic, even a political traitor, through Europe). The Arnoldists were condemned as heretics by Pope Lucius III in  Ad abolendam during the Synod of Verona in 1184. 

Their tenets would later be addressed by Bonacursus of Milan, c. 1190, in his Manifestatio haeresis Catharorum, which refuted Arnoldist apostolic poverty and the incapacity of sinful priests to administer the sacraments.

See also
Apostolic poverty
Lollardy
Temporal power of the Roman papacy
Waldensians

Notes

References

 
 

Former Christian denominations
Heresy in Christianity in the Middle Ages